The EO is an early commercial tablet computer that was created by Eo, Inc. (later acquired by AT&T Corporation), and released in April 1993. Eo (Latin for "I go") is the hardware spin-out of GO. Officially named the AT&T EO Personal Communicator, it is similar to a large personal digital assistant with wireless communications, and competed against the Apple Newton. The unit was produced in conjunction with David Kelley Design, frog design, and the Matsushita, Olivetti and Marubeni corporations.

Among the EO customers AT&T claimed were: New York Stock Exchange, Andersen Consulting, Lawrence Livermore Laboratories, FD Titus & Sons and Woolworths.

Eo, Inc., 52 percent owned by AT&T, shut down operations on July 29, 1994, after failing to meet its revenue targets and to secure the funding to continue. It was reported that 10,000 of the computers had been sold.

In 2012, PC Magazine called the AT&T EO 440, "the first true phablet".

Product specifics
Two models, the Communicator 440 and 880, were produced and measure about the size of a small clipboard.  Both are powered by the AT&T Hobbit chip, created by AT&T specifically for running code written in the C programming language. They feature I/O ports such as modem, parallel, serial, VGA out and SCSI. The devices come with a wireless cellular network modem, a built-in microphone with speaker, and a free subscription to AT&T EasyLink Mail for both fax and e-mail messages.

The operating system, PenPoint OS, was created by GO Corporation. Widely praised for its simplicity and ease of use, the OS did not gain widespread use. The applications suite, Perspective, was licensed to EO by Pensoft.

See also
 Pen computing
 History of tablet computers
 Celeste Baranski

Notes

External links
 
 
 The EO 440 And EO 880 (subscription required)
 EO 440 receives one of 1993 Byte Awards
 Personal retrospective about working for EO

Computer-related introductions in 1993
AT&T computers
Personal digital assistants
Tablet computers